"Give Me Your Love" is a 2003 song written by  and  and recorded by Jessica Andersson and Magnus Bäcklund as "Fame". The song won Melodifestivalen 2003 and was the  entry for the Eurovision Song Contest 2003, where it placed 5th out of 26 competing entries.

Melodifestivalen and the Eurovision Song Contest

"Give Me Your Love" participated in the second heat of the 2003 Melodifestivalen which was held on 22 February 2003 at the Scandinavium indoor arena in Gothenburg. The song was performed sixth of the eight competing entries and directly qualified to the contest final as one of the two songs song which received the most telephone votes. On 15 March, during the final held at the Globe Arena in Stockholm, Fame were the first of the ten competing acts to perform, and "Give Me Your Love" won the contest with 240 points, receiving the highest number of votes from the regional juries and the public vote.

"Never Let It Go" was performed on 24 May 2003 at the Eurovision Song Contest in Riga, Latvia. Sweden was drawn to perform in twenty-fifth position of the 26 competing entries, and subsequently Fame finished in fifth place, receiving 107 points in total, including the maximum 12 points from Romania.

Track listing
CD single (MLCDS 011)
 "Give Me Your Love"  (Original Radio Version)  - 3:03
 "Give Me Your Love"  (PVC One 5 Radio Mix) - 3:28
 "Give Me Your Love"  (PVC One 5 Club Mix) - 8:46
 "Give Me Your Love"  (PVC One 5 Ultra Dub) - 8:47

Charts

Weekly charts

Year-end charts

Certifications
In 2003, "Give Me Your Love" was certified gold in Sweden.

References

Eurovision songs of Sweden
Eurovision songs of 2003
Melodifestivalen songs of 2003
Number-one singles in Sweden
Fame (duo) songs
Songs written by Calle Kindbom
2003 songs